Coopers Square (originally called Burton Shopping Centre) is an indoor shopping centre located in Burton-upon-Trent, Staffordshire, England. It is owned by the Grosvenor Group. The shopping centre has 800 car parking spaces, with a ground car park as well as a rooftop car park.

History

The site was opened in 1970 by HRH Princess Alexandra as Burton Shopping Centre. The centre underwent a large refurbishment which was completed in 1994, which included the addition of a roof on the centre and a change of name to Coopers Square Shopping Centre.

Prior to the 1994 redevelopment of Coopers Square, Dame Paulet Walk was formerly known as 'Fennel Walk'. Dame Paulet's Almshouses occupied the site where Primark now stands; the original doorway is installed into the side of the building. Also, The Burton Cooper statue stood in the entrance of Saint Modwens Walk on High Street and the rubbish bins resembled beer casks.

In 1996 Sainsbury's moved to a new unit that had been built across the road. The former unit was split up and became a BHS (closed in 2016), JJB Sports, and the now defunct retailer, Au Naturale. The former BHS store was redeveloped as a new Next at Home store, which opened in October 2017.

Malls

Coopers Square consists of five 'malls'. These are:

Underhill Walk
Swan Walk
St Modwens Walk
Dame Paulet Walk
Cooper's Square

Stores
Below is a partial list of stores in the centre as of July 2020:

Superdrug
WH Smith 
Card Factory
Clarks
Early Learning Centre 
EE
GAME 
Boots
Marks & Spencer 
The Carphone Warehouse 
Next at Home 
Primark 
JD Sports
Greggs
Thorntons
H&M
Waterstones
New Look
River Island
Vodafone
O2 Store
Three
Vision Express
Timpson
Smiggle
Peacocks
Pandora
Holland & Barrett

Facilities

The centre's facilities include toilets and a cafe called Ronnie's Patisserie, which replaced Patisserie Valerie when it closed after the company went into administration in 2019.

References 

Shopping centres in Staffordshire
Buildings and structures in Burton upon Trent
1970 establishments in England
Shopping malls established in 1970